(Latin for "body of the crime";), in Western law, is the principle that a crime must be proved to have occurred before a person can be convicted of committing that crime.

For example, a person cannot be tried for larceny unless it can be proven that property has been stolen. Likewise, in order for a person to be tried for arson it must be proven that a criminal act resulted in the burning of a property. Black's Law Dictionary (6th ed.) defines "corpus delicti as: "the fact of a crime having been actually committed".

In common law systems, the concept has its outgrowth in several principles. Many jurisdictions hold as a legal rule that a defendant's out-of-court confession, alone, is insufficient evidence to prove the defendant's guilt beyond reasonable doubt. A corollary to this rule is that an accused cannot be convicted solely upon the testimony of an accomplice. Some jurisdictions also hold that without first showing independent corroboration that a crime happened, the prosecution may not introduce evidence of the defendant's statement.

Requirements
In general, all corpus delicti requires at a minimum:

 The occurrence of the specific injury; and
 some criminal act as the source of the injury.

For example:

 Homicide: 1) An individual has died 2) as a result of action (or inaction) by another person.
 Larceny: 1) Property is missing 2) because it was stolen.

In essence corpus delicti of crimes refers to evidence that a violation of law occurred, no literal 'body' is needed.

Murder cases
When a person  disappears and cannot be contacted, many police agencies initiate a missing person case. If, during the course of the investigation, detectives believe that they have been murdered, then a "body" of evidentiary items, including physical, demonstrative and testimonial evidence, must be obtained to establish that the missing person has indeed died, and that their death was by homicide, before a suspect can be charged with murder. The clearest evidence in these cases is the physical body of the deceased. However, in the event that a body is not present or has not yet been discovered, it is possible to prove a crime took place if sufficient circumstantial evidence is presented to prove the matter beyond a reasonable doubt. For example, the presence at a missing person's home of spilled human blood, identifiable as that person's, in sufficient quantity to indicate exsanguination, demonstrates—even in the absence of a corpse—that the possibility that no crime has occurred, and the missing person is merely missing, is not reasonably credible.

Misinterpretation

The British serial killer John George Haigh destroyed the bodies of his victims with acid apparently because he thought that, in the absence of a corpse, murder could not be proven because there was no corpus delicti. Haigh had misinterpreted the Latin word corpus as a literal body rather than a figurative one. This had previously been the case, under Matthew Hale's Rule of "no body, no crime", but in the twentieth century, the law expanded to allow prosecution for murder solely on circumstantial evidence.

The sovereign citizen movement often uses this term during routine traffic stops. Sovereign citizens believe that traffic infractions are not crimes, and thus can not be proven in a court of law.

See also
 Corroboration in Scots law
 Element (criminal law)
 Murder conviction without a body

References

External links 
 

Criminal law
Evidence law
Legal rules with Latin names